Ceratoderus is a genus of beetles in the family Carabidae, containing the following species:

 Ceratoderus andrewesi Desneux, 1905 
 Ceratoderus bifasciatus Kollan, 1836
 Ceratoderus klapperichi Reichenspenger, 1954
 Ceratoderus oberthueri Gestro, 1901 
 Ceratoderus palpalis Reichensperger, 1935 
 Ceratoderus tonkinensis Wasmann, 1921
 Ceratoderus venustus Hisamatsu, 1963

References

Paussinae